C. Aryama Sundaram is an Indian lawyer. He has been designated as a senior advocate. . He has regularly been representing Board of Control for Cricket in India, Anil Ambani and several other high-profile clients at various judicial forums.

Sundaram primarily practices corporate law but also takes up constitutional law and media related cases. He was a lawyer in the S. Rangarajan case which resulted in one of the landmark judgments on the freedom of speech and expression.

References

Living people
Indian corporate lawyers
Year of birth missing (living people)